Briartown is an unincorporated community in Muskogee County, Oklahoma, United States.

Demographics

References

Unincorporated communities in Muskogee County, Oklahoma
Unincorporated communities in Oklahoma